Clayton Township is located in Woodford County, Illinois at T28N, R1E. As of the 2010 census, its population was 697 and it contained 300 housing units. Clayton Township and Linn Township (T28N, R1W) were originally the same township, but the date of separation is unknown.

Geography

Demographics

References

External links
City-data.com
Illinois State Archives

Townships in Woodford County, Illinois
Townships in Illinois